The 2004 Great Alaska Shootout was held November 24, 2005, through November 27, 2004 at Sullivan Arena in Anchorage, Alaska

Brackets

Men's

Women's

References

Great Alaska Shootout
Great Alaska Shootout
Great Alaska Shootout
2004 in sports in Alaska
November 2004 sports events in the United States